The First Congregational Church of Pescadero, also known as the Pescadero Community Church, is a historic United Church of Christ on Stage Road, in Pescadero, California.

It was built in 1867 and added to the National Register of Historic Places in 1980.  The listing included the church building, and a contributing structure and a contributing site.

Otherwise the church has Classical Revival details.

It is significant as "the first church building to be constructed in the town of Pescadero solely for religious purposes. It is now the oldest, surviving wooden church building on its original site and in continuous church usage and without major renovations in the San Francisco Peninsula and Santa Clara Valley region."

References

External links

Congregational churches in California
Churches on the National Register of Historic Places in California
Neoclassical architecture in California
Churches completed in 1890
Buildings and structures in San Mateo County, California
National Register of Historic Places in San Mateo County, California
California Historical Landmarks
Neoclassical church buildings in the United States